Loiano is a town and comune of Metropolitan City of Bologna in the Emilia-Romagna region of Italy in the Tusco-Emilian Apennines at  above sea level.  Highway SS 65 connects it to Bologna,  to the north, and Florence,  to the south.

It is the site of the astronomical observatory of the University of Bologna, named after the astronomer Giovanni Domenico Cassini.

At Val Sicura, within the territory of the commune, a shooting range founded in 1889 remains active.

References

External links
Official website 
Loiano Astronomical Observatory
Loiano webcam
Loiano Shooting Range

Cities and towns in Emilia-Romagna